Lilingis was a governor of Isauria, himself of Isaurian origin, who revolted against the emperor Anastasius together with other figures like Longinus of Cardala. He was killed after the Battle of Cotyaeum.

References

5th-century Byzantine people
Byzantine rebels
Isaurians